Lynn or Linda Wood may refer to:

Lynn Faulds Wood, British television presenter and cancer campaigner
Linda Wood, harpist on Fly with the Wind

See also
Lynnwood, Washington
Lynwood, California
L. Lin Wood, attorney and conspiracy theorist
Lynn Woods, Massachusetts
Lynne Woods, producer of The Wiley Park Singers
Lynnwood (disambiguation)